More than Blue is a 2018 Taiwanese romance drama film directed by Gavin Lin. It is a remake of the 2009 South Korean film of the same name. The film stars Taiwanese actors like Jasper Liu and Ivy Chen. On November 30, 2018, it was released

Synopsis 
The film entails the story of a terminally ill man who sets up his best friend, whom he had loved since high school, so that she won't be alone after his death.

Cream, who has a bright personality with a dark streak, somehow manages to bond with K, who is a generally secretive person. As high school classmates, they share their feelings, becomes close to one another, and fills the pit in their stomach. Cream moves into K's place and live like a family. Years go by, K works for a record company and Cream becomes a lyricist, but they still live together, neither a couple nor friends. Diagnosed with leukemia, K resents to reveal his diagnosis as he does not want to hurt Cream by leaving her alone. Not knowing any of this, Cream starts dating another man and as time went by, she accepted his marriage proposal.

Cast
 Jasper Liu as Chang Che-kai (K)
 Ivy Chen as Song Yuan-yuan (Cream)
 Bryan Chang as Yang You-hsien 
 Annie Chen as Cindy

Special appearance
 Pipi Yao as Young Song Yuan-yuan (Cream)
 Chih Tian- as Young Chang Che-kai (K)
 Emma Wu as Bonnie
 Da Qing as Ji Ge
 Bruce Hung as Ah Bang
 A-Lin as herself
 Heaven Hai as Maggie

Production
Filming began in January 2018.

Reception

Busan Film Festival
The film received a warm response at its world premiere at the 23rd Busan International Film Festival open cinema category where tickets sold out within 5 minutes. Main cast Jasper Liu and Ivy Chen were awarded the "Face of Asia" prize by the film festival.

Box Office
Domestically, the film made NT$32 million on the first 3 days, breaking the box office record of highest opening Taiwanese film in 2018. The film eclipsed the NT$100 million mark within 9 days of release, breaking the box office speed record of hit Taiwanese film, Our Times which grossed NT$100 million in 10 days in 2015. By the 11th day of release, the film made NT$135 million, attracting an audience of 580,000 admissions, becoming the highest-grossing Taiwanese film of 2018. As of 17 February 2019, the film has grossed NT$239,577,835 in Taiwan.

In Hong Kong, it grossed HK$1.7 million by the first 3 days of opening, becoming the highest opening Taiwanese film in Hong Kong in recent 3 years. By 11 December 2018, the film had made , staying in the top 5 box office rankings for a consecutive number of days. As of 30 December 2018, the film has grossed  in Hong Kong.

In China, where it released on 14 March 2019, the film surpassed Captain Marvel at the box office, grossing  in its opening week. Female audiences accounted for 65% of the tickets sold in its opening week. As of 23 March 2019, More than Blue has grossed  in China.

Sequel 
In 2021, the movie received a television adaptation, More than Blue: The Series. It premiered on October 22, 2021 on Netflix

References

External links

 
 

2018 films
2010s Mandarin-language films
Taiwanese romantic drama films
Remakes of South Korean films
Films about cancer
Films about music and musicians
Films about orphans
2018 romantic drama films
Films directed by Gavin Lin